Jean Melva Stonell (30 December 1928 – 27 July 2008) was a New Zealand cricketer who played as a right-handed batter. She appeared in four Test matches for New Zealand between 1957 and 1966. She played domestic cricket for Wellington.

References

External links
 
 

1928 births
2008 deaths
Cricketers from Wellington City
New Zealand women cricketers
New Zealand women Test cricketers
Wellington Blaze cricketers